Andrew Chatwood (3 July 1932 – 3 August 2014) was a Canadian administrator and politician. Chatwood was a Liberal party member of the House of Commons of Canada. He was an administrative supervisor by career.

He was first elected at the Grand Falls—White Bay—Labrador riding in a 19 September 1966 by-election, but defeated there in the 1968 federal election by Ambrose Peddle of the Progressive Conservative party. He died of heart failure in 2014.

References

External links
 

1932 births
2014 deaths
Members of the House of Commons of Canada from Newfoundland and Labrador
Liberal Party of Canada MPs